This is a list of photovoltaic power stations in Canada with a nameplate capacity of 10 MW.

Photovoltaic power stations

See also
List of power stations in Canada by type
List of photovoltaic power stations

References

External links

Alberta Energy System Operator

AESO Current Supply Demand Report

Alberta Major Projects - Inventory of private and public solar projects valued at $5 million or greater.

Photovoltaic